Jørgen Boye Nielsen (28 February 1925 – 7 February 2000) was a Danish field hockey player who participated in the Danish national team at the 1948 Summer Olympics in London. Jørgen Boye Nielsen played for Orient and achieved a total of 8 international matches from 1946-1948.

At the Olympics in 1948, Denmark became number 13 and last after three defeats and a draw in the initial pool; thus, Denmark was eliminated from the tournament. Jørgen Boye Nielsen played all four matches without scoring.

References

External links
 

1925 births
2000 deaths
Danish male field hockey players
Olympic field hockey players of Denmark
Field hockey players at the 1948 Summer Olympics
Sportspeople from Frederiksberg